Silvia Luisa Carreño-Coll (born 1963) is a United States district judge for the United States District Court for the District of Puerto Rico and a former United States magistrate judge of the same court.

Education 

Carreño-Coll earned her Bachelor of Arts, cum laude, from Emerson College and her Juris Doctor, cum laude, from the University of Puerto Rico School of Law.

Legal career 

Carreño-Coll served as Associate Regional Counsel for Caribbean Programs in the United States Environmental Protection Agency and as an Assistant United States Attorney in the United States Attorney's Office for the District of Puerto Rico.

Teaching and memberships 

Carreño-Coll teaches a Federal Practice seminar at the University of Puerto Rico School of Law and is a member of the Federal Bar District Examination Committee.

Federal judicial service

Service as United States magistrate judge 

Carreño-Coll served as a United States magistrate judge for the District of Puerto Rico from 2011 until 2020.

Service as United States district court judge 

On August 28, 2019, President Donald Trump announced his intent to nominate Carreño-Coll to serve as a United States district judge for the United States District Court for the District of Puerto Rico. She has been nominated to the seat vacated by Judge Jay A. Garcia-Gregory, who assumed senior status on September 30, 2018. On October 15, 2019, her nomination was sent to the United States Senate. On October 16, 2019, a hearing on her nomination was held before the Senate Judiciary Committee. Resident Commissioner of Puerto Rico Jenniffer González has announced her support of the nomination. On November 7, 2019, her nomination was reported out of committee by a voice vote. On February 25, 2020, the Senate invoked cloture on her nomination by a 96–1 vote. Her nomination was confirmed later that day by a 96–0 vote. She received her judicial commission on February 26, 2020.

References

External links 
 
 

1963 births
Living people
21st-century American judges
20th-century Puerto Rican lawyers
21st-century Puerto Rican lawyers
Assistant United States Attorneys
Emerson College alumni
Hispanic and Latino American judges
Judges of the United States District Court for the District of Puerto Rico
People from Santo Domingo
Puerto Rican lawyers
United States district court judges appointed by Donald Trump
United States magistrate judges
University of Puerto Rico alumni
20th-century American women lawyers
20th-century American lawyers
21st-century American women lawyers
21st-century American lawyers
21st-century American women judges